It's All in the Game may refer to:

In music:
 "It's All in the Game" (song), a 1958 song by Tommy Edwards
 It's All in the Game (Merle Haggard album), 1984
 It's All in the Game (Nena album), 1985
 It's All in the Game (Eric Alexander album), 2005
 It's All in the Game, a 2001 album by Engelbert Humperdinck

In television:
 It's All in the Game (game show), a Dutch television game show
 "It's All in the Game" (Columbo), an episode of the TV series Columbo